Action on Smoking and Health (ASH) is the name of a number of autonomous pressure groups (charities) in the anglosphere that seek to publicize the risks associated with tobacco smoking and campaign for greater restrictions on use and on cigarette and tobacco sales.

ASH (United States)

In the US, ASH was formed in 1967 by John F. Banzhaf III, and a distinguished body of physicians, attorneys and other prominent citizens who saw the need for an organization to represent nonsmokers’ rights. Over the years, ASH has taken the lead on a variety of initiatives to counter the deaths and economic burden imposed by the tobacco industry.

ASH has a long history of advocacy, education and legal initiatives in the fight against tobacco. ASH has fought for health in courts, before legislative bodies and regulatory agencies, as well as international agencies such as the United Nations and the World Health Organization.
ASH's work and the work of its allies has spanned more than 40 years. Since the release of the original Surgeon General Report on smoking in January 1964, the global initiative for the prevention of tobacco-related damages has made enormous progress—and ASH has played a major role in achieving this progress.

ASH's actions have led to significant progress, including:
 A ban on cigarette commercials over the airwaves in 1971;
 A decision by Congress to ban smoking on airline flights in 1990;
 The implementation of smoke-free legislation in a number of jurisdictions in the United States and other countries;
 A 2001 executive order by President Bill Clinton prohibiting the government from promoting the sale or export of tobacco products;
 Adoption and implementation of the WHO Framework Convention on Tobacco Control (FCTC), the first international treaty that deals exclusively with tobacco issues;
 Inclusion of a tobacco use reduction indicator and the WHO FCTC in the UN Sustainable Development Goals;
 A global discussion and advocacy resources to link tobacco control and human rights.

ASH (United Kingdom)

In the United Kingdom, ASH is a registered charity established in 1971, that aims to eliminate the harm caused by tobacco. It works to raise awareness of the health risks of tobacco, and also campaigns for policy measures. It provides the secretariat of the All-Party Parliamentary Group on smoking and health.

History 
ASH was established in 1971 by the Royal College of Physicians following the refusal of the UK Government to act on the college's demand for laws to reduce tobacco use. Former health minister, John Dunwoody, became its first director. Its present-day board of trustees reflects its continued support from the medical establishment as it is composed largely of doctors and scientists.

ASH was awarded a WHO World No Tobacco Day Award in May 2011 and the 2012 Luther L Terry Award for "Outstanding Organization" by the American Cancer Society in December 2011.

Its current chief executive, appointed in 2003, is Deborah Arnott. She was appointed honorary associate professor in the Division of Epidemiology and Public Health University of Nottingham in 2011 and won the 2007 Alwyn Smith Prize awarded annually by the UK Faculty of Public Health to the person judged to have made the most outstanding contribution to the health of the public.

Funding 
ASH is a charity describing itself as a "campaigning public health charity that works to eliminate the harm caused by tobacco".

Its funding for its core campaigning programme comes from the British Heart Foundation (BHF) and Cancer Research UK (CRUK). It has also received funding from the Department of Health under its Section 64 grant programme, which is earmarked for specific projects to further the department's public health objectives, and cannot be used to lobby the government.

Campaigns 
ASH uses funding from the BHF and CRUK to influence policy on a variety of issues including taxation and smuggling, health inequalities, harm reduction, and smoking and young people. It also works to raise awareness of the methods used by the tobacco industry to influence public health policies. ASH coordinates the Smokefree Action Coalition (SFAC), the umbrella group for organisations working to reduce the harm caused by tobacco, which was set up to campaign for comprehensive smoke-free legislation.

In February 2006, ASH won its campaign for legislation which created comprehensive smoke-free indoor workplace regulation, introduced in England on 1 July 2007. The smoke-free regulations included all pubs, bars and private members' clubs, as well as cafés, restaurants, and enclosed workplaces. A similar smoke-free law had already come into force in Scotland in March 2006, and Northern Ireland and Wales followed in April 2007. Campaigning after this point focussed on the need for a new government strategy on tobacco control.

In 2008, ten years after the publication of "Smoking Kills", a white paper on tobacco and the first comprehensive strategy to tackle the issue, ASH published "Beyond Smoking Kills" which provided a review of progress on the control of tobacco. The report called for a number of measures including a tobacco display ban, prohibition of the sale of tobacco from vending machines and standardised tobacco packaging.

The Health Act 2009 provides for removal of vending machines for tobacco products (implemented in October 2011) and for the prohibition of the display of tobacco products at the point of sale in England, Wales and Northern Ireland. In March 2011, the Government committed to implement the point of sale legislation in England in large shops from April 2012 and in smaller shops from April 2015. It also committed to a public consultation on standardised packaging in early 2012. ASH, and the SFAC, actively campaigned for the introduction of standardised packaging, which was included in the Children and Families Act 2014 and was passed into law in March 2015. The charity described it as the "most important public health reform of this Parliament."

In 2015, ASH published "Smoking Still Kills" which called for a new government tobacco control strategy, and made a number of recommendations including an annual levy on tobacco companies to fund measures to help smokers quit and prevent youth uptake. At the launch of the report, Parliamentary Under Secretary of State for Public Health Jane Ellison committed to a new tobacco control strategy. Christopher Snowdon, a research fellow at the Institute of Economic Affairs, which had received funding from tobacco firms, noted the influence of the charity saying that the "manifesto of this tiny pressure group is, in effect, the manifesto of whichever party is in power."

ASH is also a member of the World Health Organization's Framework Convention Alliance on Tobacco Control.

Membership 
ASH covers the whole of the UK and encourages supporters to get involved in the organisation's work, or just lend financial support. ASH Northern Ireland, ASH Scotland and ASH Wales are separate organisations.

ASH Scotland
ASH Scotland is an independent Scottish charity which aims to take action to reduce the harm caused by tobacco. First founded under the auspices of the Royal College of Physicians of Edinburgh in 1973, ASH Scotland became a wholly separate charity in 1993. ASH Scotland was awarded a WHO World No Tobacco Day Award in 2018.

The organisation seeks to improve health and quality of life by limiting the number of young people taking up smoking, reducing the number of adult smokers, protecting people from second-hand smoke and tackling the inequality resulting from tobacco use. This involves campaigning for change in the law, providing information to politicians, healthcare professionals and the public, and running programmes designed to help people be tobacco-free.

Following ASH Scotland campaigns, Scotland was the first part of the UK to introduce smoke-free public places legislation and the first part of the UK (and the third country globally) to declare a tobacco-free date (2034) as part of the Scottish Government's tobacco control strategy 'Creating a tobacco-free generation'.

ASH Wales
ASH Wales is a smoking cessation and health charity that began in 1976  as an autonomous branch of ASH UK, and later gained independent charity status in 2007. Its aim is to reduce the prevalence of smoking across Wales by identifying and addressing influential factors, increasing public awareness, and improving the quality and reach of cessation services. ASH Wales engages in a variety of projects including campaigning for tobacco-control public-health policy, research, training, educational workshops, advocacy, and support.

Campaigns 
From 2012 onward ASH Wales campaigned for all 22 local authorities in Wales to introduce smoke-free policies in their children's playgrounds. To date, 20 out of 22 local authorities have implemented voluntary bans in their local playgrounds, with another currently in the process of implementing a ban.

ASH Wales played an instrumental role in the Welsh Government's decision to enforce a ban on smoking in cars with children. Smoking in a private vehicle when someone under the age of 18 is present became illegal in England and Wales on 1 October 2015.

The Filter Project 
The Filter is the youth project of ASH Wales which delivers quit smoking support and prevention for children and young people aged 11–25. The Filter provides workshops and quit smoking programmes delivered by smoking cessation advisors.

The Filter Project was launched in 2013 as a result of funding from the Big Lottery Fund. Since then The Filter has delivered its workshops and cessation support to more than 6,000 people across Wales. From 2015 The Filter became part of an Erasmus+ funded partnership bringing together organisations from five different EU countries with the aim of reducing tobacco consumption across all of the nations. This partnership will examine the potential of The Filter to work on a transnational basis.

Wales Tobacco or Health Network 
The Wales Tobacco or Health Network (WTHN) is a professional network led by ASH Wales for individuals in Wales with an interest in tobacco and its impact on public health. It focuses on smoking and tobacco control but also on wider issues of health and well being such as the links between wealth and health inequality.

The network contains both individuals and organisations with members from many sectors, including academia, the tobacco control community, education, government, healthcare, local government, the media, the NHS, public health, and the private and voluntary sectors.

Wales Tobacco Control Alliance 
The Wales Tobacco Control Alliance (WTCA) is a network managed by ASH Wales to enable all third sector and professional organisations involved with tackling tobacco in Wales to inform and influence policy development and implementation. The WTCA came together to campaign for a comprehensive Tobacco Control Strategy for Wales and now work to monitor this plan and reduce the harm caused by tobacco use more generally. Since 2008 over 30 organisations have joined the WTCA. This includes other charities like Cancer Research UK, the British Heart Foundation, along with professional bodies such as the Royal College of Physicians and the British Medical Association.

Following a campaign by the WTCA the Welsh Government published its Tobacco Control Action Plan in February 2012 which set out a comprehensive strategy containing ambitions to reduce adult smoking prevalence to 16% by 2020.

ASH (Australia)

ASH (Canada) 

Founded in 1979, ASH is one of Canada's leading tobacco control organizations.

ASH Ireland
In 1992, ASH Ireland was established by the Irish Heart Foundation and the Irish Cancer Society.

ASH (New Zealand) 

In New Zealand, ASH was formed in 1983. In 2011, the New Zealand Government set a target of making NZ smokefree by 2025. It was a member of the anti-smoking organisation Smokefree Coalition.

See also 
 Smoking in the United Kingdom
 List of cigarette smoke carcinogens
 Tobacco control
 Philip Morris v. Uruguay
 FOREST, pro-smoking UK pressure group

References

External links
 ASH United States
 ASH New Zealand
 ASH Scotland
ASH United Kingdom
 Smokefree Action Coalition

Smoking in the United Kingdom
Smoking in the United States
Smoking in Canada
Smoking in Australia
Smoking in New Zealand
Tobacco control
Charities based in London
Charities based in Wales
Health campaigns
Public health organizations
Health charities in the United States
Health in Canada
Health charities in Canada
Health charities in Australia
Public health in the United Kingdom
Charities based in Scotland
Medical and health organizations based in Washington, D.C.